The 2022–23 season was the 29th season in the history of Csurgói KK and their 15th consecutive season in the top flight. The club will participate in Nemzeti Bajnokság I and the Magyar Kupa.

Players

Squad information
Squad for the 2022–23 season. 

Goalkeepers
 12  Balázs Holló
 16  Ádám Füstös
 45  Tamás Konyicsák
Left Wingers
2  Tomislav Špruk
6  Gergely Bazsó
Right Wingers
 17  Ádám Tóth
 25  Ádám Gebhardt
Line Players 
3  László Szeitl
 18  Erik Szeitl
 27  Matko Rotim

Left Backs
 10  Mirko Herceg
 15  Tamás Borsos
 20  Marcell Gábor
 24  Ádám Vasvári
Central Backs
 11  Mladen Krsmančić
 13  Rok Skol
 65  Péter Horváth
Right Backs
9  Grega Krečič
 77  Mitar Markez

Transfers
Source: Rajt a K&H férfi ligában

 IN
  Balázs Holló (from  Dabas)  Mitar Markez (from  Gyöngyös)  Rok Skol (from  HSG Graz)  Tomislav Špruk (from  Koper) OUT
  Péter Ács (loan to  NEKA)  Marcell Breuer (loan to  Ajka)  Gyula Kerkovits (to  Százhalombatta)  Antonio Kovačević (?)  Bruno Kozina (to  HSC Kreuzlingen)  Péter Tatai (to  Tatai AC)  Zsolt Schäffer (to  Gyöngyös)Staff members
Source: Staff - Adatok, Szakmai stáb 2022-2023

 Head Coach: Norbert Baranyai
 Assistant and Youth Coach:  Darko Pavlović
 Goalkeeping Coach: Imre Szabó
 Fitness Coach: Levente Bakai
 Club Doctor: Mária Dergez MD
 Masseur: Ferenc Gazda

Club

Management
Source: Management (Klubvezetés)

Uniform
Supplier: hummel
Shirt sponsor (front): tippmix / PriMont / MenDan**** / KLH Masters / Csurgó
Shirt sponsor (back): Patrik & Varga Gazdasági tanácsadó Zrt. / Dráva-Coop Zrt.
Shorts sponsor: PriMont / KLH Masters / www.cskk.hu

Competitions
Times up to 30 October 2022 and from 26 March 2023 are CEST (UTC+2). Times from 30 October 2022 to 26 March 2023 are CET (UTC+1).

Overview

Nemzeti Bajnokság I

Regular season

Results by round

Matches
The league fixtures were announced on 5 July 2022.FÉRFI KÉZILABDA NB I, 2022–2023

Results overview

Magyar Kupa

Csurgó entered the tournament in the fourth round.

Statistics

Top scorers
Includes all competitive matches. The list is sorted by shirt number when total goals are equal. Last updated on 18 September 2022.''

References

External links
 

 
Csurgói KK